Ruhrstadion, known as Vonovia Ruhrstadion for sponsorship reasons, is a football stadium in Bochum, Germany. It is the home ground for the VfL Bochum and has a capacity of 27,599. It was known as rewirpowerSTADION  (or, rarely) from 2006 to 2016, also for sponsorship reasons.

History
In 1911 the Spiel und Sport Bochum leased a meadow from a local farmer as their new home ground. The club played the first match at the new venue against the VfB Hamm in front of 500 spectators. The TuS Bochum did not build a stadium until after World War I as late as 1921.

The stadium has a capacity of 27,599 people. The original capacity was over 50,000 but was decreased by numerous modifications.

The stadium was expanded between March 1976 and July 1979 and the first game was between the VfL Bochum and SG Wattenscheid 09 on 21 July 1979. This expansion could technically count as a complete rebuild; legally, it is officially an expansion.

David Bowie performed at the stadium during his Serious Moonlight Tour on 15 June 1983.
Herbert Grönemeyer performed multiple sold out concerts at the stadium in 1985, 1994, 1998, 2003, 2007, 2009, 2012, 2015 and 2019. Additionally, his song Bochum is sung before the kickoff of every home match of VfL Bochum, with the final line before the final chorus of the piece bearing special significance to the club. Herbert has been an honorary member of the club since 2006.

The stadium hosted a UEFA Champions League match between CSKA Moscow and Rangers in December 1992 because the teams weren't able to play in Moscow for weather reasons.

In 2006, a five-year naming rights deal was struck with Stadtwerke Bochum to rename the stadium "rewirpowerSTADION". In 2016 the name of the stadium was officially changed to "Vonovia Ruhrstadion", with the first part of the name being its new sponsor, the German housing association Vonovia, located in Bochum.

References

External links
 Ruhrstadion picture

Football venues in Germany
Sports venues in North Rhine-Westphalia
VfL Bochum
2011 FIFA Women's World Cup stadiums
Buildings and structures in Bochum